The Río Matón Bridge, in Matón Abajo, a barrio of Cayey, Puerto Rico, was built in 1886.  It was listed on the National Register of Historic Places in 1995.

It is a lateral solid web girder bridge spanning Río Matón. It was built as part of the Carretera Central.  Its iron span was designed by Spanish engineer Manuel Lopez-Bayo, and was brought from Europe.  Its purchase cost was 11,105 francs.

It carries Highway 14, at km 63.2.

It has also been known as Bridge #1.  Its designer was engineer, Manuel Lopez-Bayo. The bridge entered the NRHP because of its architecture and engineering and because it demonstrates an important time in the history of Puerto Rico.

References

Road bridges on the National Register of Historic Places in Puerto Rico
Bridges completed in 1886
1886 establishments in Puerto Rico
National Register of Historic Places in Cayey, Puerto Rico
Girder bridges